Fijewo  (() is a village, the seat of the administrative district of Gmina Lubawa, within Iława County, Warmian-Masurian Voivodeship, in northern Poland.

References

Fijewo